Claire Bennet is a fictional character in the NBC psychological thriller superhero drama series Heroes. She is portrayed by Hayden Panettiere and first appeared on television in the pilot episode of the series, "Genesis", on September 25, 2006. She is a high school cheerleader with the power of rapid cellular regeneration. Claire appears in more episodes than any other character (72, plus a 73rd through stock footage). In Heroes Reborn, she dies while giving birth to Malina and Tommy.

Thanks to her power, she has an incredibly high pain tolerance; Claire states in "The Butterfly Effect" that, when injured, she feels pain just as severe as anyone else who was injured in such a way, but her power quickly deadens pain. When asked about this, series writers Joe Pokaski and Aron Coleite would only comment that she "feels pain, but not the way most of us do." Claire, describing her response to pain to West, says "I feel pain; I just get over it quickly."
Between her tolerance for pain and seemingly unlimited healing potential, Hayden Panettiere compares her character to the X-Men character Wolverine, although she is "less hairy and without claws." Since having her brain examined by Sylar, Claire has stated that she no longer feels physical pain of any kind.

Casting
Marc Hirschfeld, executive vice president of casting for NBC Universal Television stated, "When they were trying to decide who the cheerleader should be, I literally picked up the phone and said to the producers, 'You've got to meet Hayden Panettiere. 

In an interview with Vanity Fair, Emma Stone revealed that she had auditioned for the role of Claire Bennet. She said it was her rock bottom Hollywood moment; She overheard "You are our pick ... On a scale of 1 to 10 you’re an 11" and then she realised the role had gone to Hayden Panettiere.

Reception and analysis
Panettiere received positive reviews for her work on the show throughout the series run, constantly being referred to as a "breakout star". Claire is also arguably one of the most popular characters on the show. UGO Networks listed Claire as one of their best heroes of all time.

Professor of audiovisual arts Olvido Andújar Molina saw the character of Claire Bennet as a metaphor for the United States of America, as her role as a cheerleader functioned as one of the basic American cultural archetypes. Claire Bennet's special ability was regeneration from any kind of accident, which in this reading symbolizes the idea of the United States being invincible in the long term. Andújar Molina expands the idea to the character of Nathan Petrelli: As he is discovered as Claire's biological father, he represents the father figure and protector of the country as a whole. Andújar Molina thought that this identification of the characters, together with their presentation as heroes trying to save the world, contributed to their positive reception and identification with the audience.

Sarah Godfrey and Hannah Hamad saw in the character a resurgence of the trope of the helpless girl in postfeminist, post-9/11 television: "Notwithstanding Claire Bennet's physical indestructibility, she remains contained by a narrative position that necessitates protection from a range of male characters."

References

External links
NBC cast page

Heroes (American TV series) characters
American female characters in television
Adoptee characters in television
Fictional bisexual females
Fictional LGBT characters in television
Fictional characters from Texas
Television characters introduced in 2006
Fictional characters with accelerated healing
Fictional cheerleaders
Fictional attempted suicides
Italian superheroes
LGBT superheroes

pl:Postacie z serialu Herosi#Claire Bennet
fi:Luettelo televisiosarjan Heroes hahmoista#Claire Bennet